018 MUAHS Guild Awards
February 16, 2019

Contemporary: 
A Star Is Born

Crazy Rich Asians

Period/Character: 
Vice

Mary Queen of Scots
The 2019 Make-Up Artists and Hair Stylists Guild Awards, honoring the best make-up and hairstyling in film and television for 2018, the winners were announced on February 16, 2019 while the nominees were announced on January 10, 2019.

Winners and nominees

Feature-Length Motion Picture

Best Contemporary Make-Up 
 A Star is Born – Ve Neill, Debbie Zoller, Sarah Tanno 
 Beautiful Boy – Jean Black, Rolf Keppler 
 Boy Erased – Kimberly Jones, Mi Young, Kyra Panchenko 
 Crazy Rich Asians – Heike Merker, Irina Strukova 
 Welcome to Marwen – Ve Neill, Rosalina De Silva 
 Widows – Ma Kalaadevi Ananda, Denise  Pugh-Ruiz, Jacqueline Fernandez

Best Contemporary Hair Styling 
 Crazy Rich Asians – Heike Merker, Sophia Knight 
 A Star is Born – Lori McCoy-Bell, Joy Zapata, Frederic Aspires 
 Nappily Ever After – Dawn Turner, Larry Simms 
 Vox Lux – Esther Ahn, Daniel Koye 
 Widows – Linda Flowers, Daniel Curet, Denise Wynbrandt

 Best Period and/or Character Make-Up 
 Vice – Kate Biscoe, Ann Pala  Williams, Jamie Kelman Bohemian Rhapsody – Jan Sewell, Mark Coulier 
 Mary Poppins Returns – Peter Robb-King, Paula Price 
 Mary Queen of Scots – Jenny Shircore, Hannah Edwards, Sarah Kelly 
 Stan & Ollie – Jeremy Woodhead, Marc Coulier 

 Best Period and/or Character Hair Styling 
 Mary Queen of Scots - Jenny Shircore, Marc Pilcher Black Panther - Camille Friend, Jaime Leigh McIntosh, Louisa Anthony 
 BlacKkKlansman - LaWanda Pierre-Weston, Shaun Perkins 
 Mary Poppins Returns - Peter Robb-King, Paula Price 

 Best Special Make-Up Effects 
 Vice – Greg Cannom, Christopher Gallaher Aquaman – Justin Raleigh, Ozzy Alvarez, Sean Genders 
 Black Panther – Joel Harlow, Ken Diaz, Sian Richards 
 Stan & Ollie – Mark Coulier, Jeremy Woodhead 
 The Ballad of Buster Scruggs – Christien Tinsley, Corey Welk, Rolf Keppler 

 Television Series, Miniseries or New Media Series 
 Best Contemporary Make-Up 
 American Horror Story: Apocalypse – Eryn Krueger Mekash, Kim Ayers, Silvina Knight Dancing with the Stars – Julie Socash, Alison Gladieux, Donna Bard 
 Saturday Night Live – Louie Zakarian, Amy Tagliamonti, Jason Milani 
 The Handmaid's Tale – Burton LeBlanc, Talia Reingold, Erika Caceres 
 Westworld – Elisa Marsh, Allan Apone, Rachel Hoke

 Best Contemporary Hair Styling 
 Dancing with the Stars – Gail Ryan, Brittany Spaulding, Jani Kleinbard American Horror Story: Apocalypse – Michelle Ceglia, Helena Cepeda, Romaine Markus-Meyers 
 Empire – Melissa Forney, Theresa Fleming, Nolan Kelly 
 Grace and Frankie – Kelly Kline, Jonathan Hanousek, Marlene Williams 
 The Handmaid's Tale – Karola Dirnberger, Ewa Cynk

 Best Period and/or Character Make-Up 
 The Marvelous Mrs. Maisel – Patricia Regan, Claus Lulla, Joseph A. Campayno GLOW – Lana Horochowski, Maurine Burke 
 Saturday Night Live – Louie Zakarian, Amy Tagliamonti, Jason Milani  
 Westworld – Elisa Marsh, Allan Apone, Rachel Hoke 
 The Assassination of Gianni Versace: American Crime Story – Robin Beauchesne, Silvina Knight, Ana Lozano

 Best Period and/or Character Hair Styling 
 The Marvelous Mrs. Maisel – Jerry DeCarlo, John Jordan, Peg Schierholz American Horror Story: Apocalypse – Michelle Ceglia, Helena Cepeda, Lydia Fantini 
 GLOW – Theraesa Rivers, Valerie Jackson 
 The Assassination of Gianni Versace: American Crime Story – Chris Clark, Natalie Driscoll, Massimo Gattabrusi 
 Vikings – Dee Corcoran, Peter Burke, Zuelika Delaney

 Best Special Make-Up Effects 
 Westworld – Justin Raleigh, Kevin Kirkpatrick, Thomas Floutz The Assassination of Gianni Versace: American Crime Story – Michael Mekash, Silvina Knight, David Anderson 
 American Horror Story: Apocalypse – Eryn Krueger Mekash, Mike Mekash, David Anderson 
 Genius: Picasso – Davina  Lamont , Goran Lundstrom, Natasha Lees 
 Saturday Night Live – Louie Zakarian, Jason Miliani, Tom Denier Jr. 

 Motion Picture for Television or Special 
 Best Contemporary Make-Up 
 King Lear – Naomi Donne, Sara Kramer A Legendary Christmas – April Chaney, Allison Bryan, Vanessa Dionne 
 2018 MTV Movie & TV Awards – Dionne Wynn 
 Oprah Winfrey Presents: Becoming Michelle Obama – Derrick Rutledge 
 To All the Boys I've Loved Before – Sharon Toohey, Madison Farwell

 Best Contemporary Hair Styling 
 Jesus Christ Superstar Live in Concert – Charles Lapointe, Kevin Maybee The 2018 Rose Parade Hosted by Cord & Tish – Roxxi Dott, Jason Hamer, Candy Neal 
 King Lear – Naomi Donne, Sara Kramer 
 2018 MTV Video Music Awards – Shawn Finch, Maggie Connolly 
 Oprah Winfrey Presents: Becoming Michelle Obama – Nicole Mangrum

 Best Special Make-Up Effects 
 Cocaine Godmother – Trefor Proud, Vicki Syskakis 
 King Lear – Naomi Donne, Sara Kramer 
 Philip K. Dick's Electric Dreams: Crazy Diamond – Kirstin Chalmers, Kristyan Mallett, Satinder Chumber 
 The Royal Wedding Live with Cord and Tish! – Autumn Butler, Jason Hamer, Vincent Van Dyke

 Daytime Television 
 Best Make-Up 
 The Young and the Restless – Patricia Denney, Marlene Mason, Kathy Jones The Bold and the Beautiful – Christine Lai Johnson, Chris Escobosa, Jennifer Wittman 
 The Price Is Right – Carol Wood, Jason Collins 
 The Real Daytime – Melanie Mills, Glen Alen Gutierrez, Motoko Honjyo Clayton 

 Best Hair Styling 
 The Young and the Restless – Regina Rodriguez, Adriana Lucio, Vanessa Bragdon The Bold and the Beautiful – Lisa Long, Danielle Spencer, Danielle Dixon 
 The Real Daytime – Roberta Gardener-Rogers, Rachel Mason, Ray Dodson 

 Children and Teen Television Programming 
 Best Make-Up 
 A Series of Unfortunate Events – Rita Ciccozzi, Krista Seller, Bill Terezakis Dancing with the Stars: Juniors – Zena Shteysel Green, Angela Moos, Patti Ramsey Bortoli 
 Henry Danger – Michael Johnston, Patti Brand-Reese, Melanie Mills 
 Sesame Street – Jane DiPersio-Murphy 
 Walk the Prank – Jennifer Aspinall, Ned Neidhardt

 Best Hair Styling 
 A Series of Unfortunate Events – Julie McHaffie, Dianne Holme 
 Dancing with the Stars: Juniors – Kimi Messina, Cheryl Eckert, Kim Ferry 
 Henry Danger – Joe Matke, Roma Goddard, Dwayne Ross 
 Lip Sync Battle Shorties – Jerilynn Stephens, Kathleen Leonard, Romy Fleming 
 Sesame Street – Jackie Payne 
 Walk the Prank – Ursula Hawks, Michelle Nyree-Collins

 Commercials and Music Videos 
 Best Make-Up 
 American Horror Story: Apocalypse "Promo" – Kerry Herta, Jason Collins, Cristina Waltz Capital One "Mona Lisa" – Tania McComas, Leslie Devlin 
 Justin Timberlake – Supplies – Koji Ohmura, Marianna Elias-Tsangaris, Amy Mills 
 Tiffany & Co. – 2018 Spring Campaign: Believe In Dreams – Erin Ayanian-Monroe 
 Venus de Milo On the Go – Wonderful Pistachios – Margaret Prentice, Brian Penikas, Mark Villalobos

 Best Hair Styling 
 American Horror Story: Apocalypse "Promo" – Joe Matke, Fernando Santaella-Navarro 
 Capital One "Louisiana Purchase" – Audrey Anzures, Jacklin Masteran, Elizabeth Rabe 
 Capital One "Mona Lisa" – Audrey Anzures, Elizabeth Rabe 
 Justin Timberlake – Supplies – Audrey Futterman-Stern, Tom Opitz
 Weird Al Yankovic – Weezer "AFRICA" – Sean James Cummins

 Theatrical Production 
 Best Make-Up 
 The Unauthorized Musical Parody of Rocky Horror – Michael Johnston, Tyson Fontaine, Lauren Lillian A Trip to the Moon – Vanessa Dionne, Jessica Mills, Renee Horner 
 Aladdin – Denise Reynolds, Patrice Madrigal 
 Annie – Vanessa Dionne, Christina Tracey, Brandi Strona 
 Candide – Darren Jinks, Brandi Strona 

 Best Hair Styling 
 Aladdin'' – Debra Parr, Michele Arvizo, Chanthy Tach
 Annie – Vanessa Dionne, Cassie Russek, Donna Levy 
 Blues in the Night – Danielle Richter 
 Love, Actually Live – Cassie Russek, Stephanie Fenner, Irma Nieves 
 Tosca'' – Jeanna Parham, Ashley Landis

Distinguished Artisan Award 
 Melissa McCarthy

Lifetime Achievement Awards 
 Susan Cabral-Ebert
 Robert Louis Stevenson

References

2018
2018 film awards
2018 television awards
2018 guild awards
2018 in fashion
2018 in American cinema
2018 in American television